Cyperus schweinfurthii is a species of sedge that is native to parts of Africa.

See also 
 List of Cyperus species

References 

schweinfurthii
Plants described in 1936
Flora of Eritrea
Flora of Burkina Faso
Taxa named by Georg Kükenthal